Tokurō is a masculine Japanese given name.

Possible writings
Tokurō can be written using different combinations of kanji characters. Some examples:

徳郎, "benevolence, son"
徳朗, "benevolence, clear"
得郎, "gain, son"
得朗, "gain, clear"
篤郎, "sincere, son"
竺郎, "bamboo, son"
啄郎, "peck, son"

The name can also be written in hiragana とくろう or katakana トクロウ.

Notable people with the name
, Japanese politician
, Japanese video game designer
, Japanese journalist
, Japanese baseball player and manager

Japanese masculine given names